Renata Śliwińska (born 5 September 1996) is a Polish Paralympic athlete competing in F40-classification discus throw and shot put events. She won the gold medal in the women's shot put F40 event at the 2020 Summer Paralympics held in Tokyo, Japan. In this event, she is also a two-time gold medalist at the World Para Athletics European Championships and a two-time silver medalist at the World Para Athletics Championships.

In 2016, she represented Poland at the Summer Paralympics and she competed in both the women's discus throw F41 and women's shot put F40 events. In the women's discus throw event she set a new world record of 23.34. She represented Poland at the 2020 Summer Paralympics in the women's shot put F40 event after she finished 2nd in the women's shot put F40 event at the 2019 World Para Athletics Championships held in Dubai, United Arab Emirates.

She won the gold medal in the women's shot put F40 event at the 2018 World Para Athletics European Championships in Berlin, Germany. She also won the silver medal in the women's discus throw F41 event.

References

External links 
 

Living people
1996 births
Polish female discus throwers
Polish female shot putters
Paralympic athletes of Poland
Athletes (track and field) at the 2016 Summer Paralympics
Athletes (track and field) at the 2020 Summer Paralympics
Medalists at the 2020 Summer Paralympics
Paralympic gold medalists for Poland
World record holders in Paralympic athletics
Medalists at the World Para Athletics European Championships
Medalists at the World Para Athletics Championships
People from Skwierzyna